Radi Gewog (Dzongkha: ར་དི་) is a gewog (village block) of Trashigang District, Bhutan.

Towns 
Rangjung

References

Gewogs of Bhutan
Trashigang District